"Mario Balotelli" is a song by grime crew Ruff Sqwad. The song is taken from their EP 2012. It was released on 24 January 2012 as a digital download.

Background
The song came into fruition when Slix had the idea of using Mario Balotelli's iconic phrase "Why Always Me?" as a chorus in a song to make a "Mario Balotelli anthem".

Music video
The official music video was filmed on 15 January 2012 and was uploaded to YouTube on 17 January 2012 at a total length of four minutes and twenty-five seconds.

Track listing
Digital Single

Credits and personnel
Personnel

 Producers – Prince Rapid
 Lyrics – Kwasi Danquah III, Slix Fleeingham, David Nkrumah, Prince Rapid
 Composer – David Nkrumah
 Label: Takeover Entertainment Limited

Release history

References

2012 singles
Takeover Entertainment singles
Ruff Sqwad songs
2012 songs
Songs with music by Tinchy Stryder